Incheon Subway Line 1 is a  north-south subway line, part of the Incheon Subway system. The line is also included as a part of the overall Seoul Metropolitan Subway network; Bupyeong Station has a free transfer with Seoul Subway Line 1, Gyeyang Station connects with the AREX Line which leads to Incheon International Airport and Seoul Station, Bupyeong-gu Office Station has a free transfer with Seoul Subway Line 7, and Woninjae Station has a free transfer with the Suin-Bundang Line.

Background
Incheon's Line 1 makes Incheon the fourth city in South Korea with a subway system, after Seoul, Busan, and Daegu.

A trip along the line from Gyeyang in the north to the International Business District in the south takes approximately 57 minutes. From Bakchon station to the International Business District station, the line is underground.

History
 March 1999: Trial runs begin.
 October 6, 1999: The line opens from Bakchon to Dongmak, after six years of construction.
 December 7, 1999: A northern extension from Bakchon to Gyulhyeon opens.
 March 16, 2007: Another northern extension from Gyulhyeon to Gyeyang opens, connecting with the Airport Railroad
 June 1, 2009: A southern extension from Dongmak to International Business District opens.
December 12, 2020: One stop extension to Songdo Moonlight Festival Park opens.

Future plans
A northward 3-station extension of the line is proposed to provide transportation to the developing Geomdan New City. Construction began in November 2020 and is expected to be completed no earlier than 2024.

Rolling Stock
The line uses 34 8-car trains. The first 25 trains were built between 1998 and 1999 by Daewoo Heavy Industries and Rotem, while the last 9 trains were built between 2007 and 2008 by Hyundai Rotem to provide trains following the extension of the line.

Stations

See also
 Incheon Subway
 List of metro systems
 Seoul Metropolitan Subway
 Transportation in South Korea

References

External links
Incheon Rapid Transit Corporation homepage, in English
Incheon Subway at UrbanRail.net

 
Seoul Metropolitan Subway lines
Subway Line 1
Railway lines opened in 1999
1999 establishments in South Korea